Perico may refer to:

People
 Gabriele Perico (born 1984), Italian footballer
 Laura Perico (born 1989), Colombian actress
 Miguel Ángel Alonso or Perico Alonso (born 1953), father of Xabi Alonso
 Perico (Spanish footballer) (born 1985), Spanish footballer
 Perico Fernandez (1952–2016), professional boxer from Zaragoza, Spain
 Perico Sambeat (born 1962), Spanish jazz saxophonist
 Simone Perico (born 1989), Italian footballer
 Perico (elder), leader of the Acaxee tribe and their rebellion against the Spanish

Places
 Perico, Cuba, a city in Matanzas Province
 Perico, Texas, a ghost town in the United States
 Ciudad Perico, a city in the Province of Jujuy, Argentina

Other uses
 Perico (dish), a popular Venezuelan and Colombian dish based on scrambled eggs and various vegetables 
 Perico (book), of short stories by Uruguayan writer Juan José Morosoli
 Perico, Spanish for parakeet